Joaquim Sampaio (born 30 August 1914, date of death unknown) was a Portuguese sports shooter. He competed in two events at the 1952 Summer Olympics.

References

External links
 

1914 births
Year of death missing
Portuguese male sport shooters
Olympic shooters of Portugal
Shooters at the 1952 Summer Olympics
Place of birth missing